Matti Raivio (22 February 1893 – 25 May 1957) was a Finnish Cross-country skier who won the 30 km and 50 km events at the 1926 FIS Nordic World Ski Championships. At the 1924 Winter Olympics he finished seventh in the 18 km and 50 km races. He abandoned the 50 km event at the 1928 Winter Olympics.

Cross-country skiing results
All results are sourced from the International Ski Federation (FIS).

Olympic Games

World Championships
 2 medals – (2 gold)

References

External links
 ;
 Suomen Hiihtoliitto – Urheilijat A-Ö 

1893 births
1957 deaths
People from Keuruu
Finnish male cross-country skiers
Olympic cross-country skiers of Finland
Cross-country skiers at the 1924 Winter Olympics
Cross-country skiers at the 1928 Winter Olympics
FIS Nordic World Ski Championships medalists in cross-country skiing
Sportspeople from Central Finland
20th-century Finnish people